13th NYFCO Awards
December 8, 2013

Best Film:
12 Years a Slave

The 13th New York Film Critics Online Awards, honoring the best in filmmaking in 2013, were given on December 8, 2013.

Winners
Best Actor:
Chiwetel Ejiofor – 12 Years a Slave
Best Actress:
Cate Blanchett – Blue Jasmine
Best Animated Film:
The Wind Rises
Best Cast:
American Hustle
Best Cinematography:
Gravity – Emmanuel Lubezki
Best Debut Director:
Ryan Coogler – Fruitvale Station
Best Director:
Alfonso Cuarón – Gravity
Best Documentary Film:
The Act of Killing
Best Film:
12 Years a Slave
Best Film Music or Score:
Inside Llewyn Davis – T-Bone Burnett
Best Foreign Language Film:
Blue Is the Warmest Colour • France
Best Screenplay:
Her – Spike Jonze
Best Supporting Actor:
Jared Leto – Dallas Buyers Club
Best Supporting Actress:
Lupita Nyong'o – 12 Years a Slave
Breakthrough Performer:
Adèle Exarchopoulos – Blue Is the Warmest Colour

NYFCO Best Films of 2013
 12 Years a Slave
 Before Midnight
 Blue Is the Warmest Colour
 Dallas Buyers Club
 Gravity
 Her
 Inside Llewyn Davis
 Nebraska
 Philomena
 Prisoners
 The Wolf of Wall Street

References

New York Film Critics Online Awards
2013 film awards
2013 in American cinema